Phạm Văn Thành (born 20 October 1958) is a Vietnamese swimmer. He competed in two events at the 1980 Summer Olympics.

References

1958 births
Living people
Vietnamese male swimmers
Olympic swimmers of Vietnam
Swimmers at the 1980 Summer Olympics
Place of birth missing (living people)